Shondell Alfred (born 7 July 1982) is a Guyanese former professional boxer who competed between 1999 and 2010. She held the WIBA bantamweight title from 2009 to 2010.

Professional career 
Alfred made her professional boxing debut on 19 February 1999, beating Stephanie George by a four-round decision at Georgetown. After two more four-round decision wins, she went to Canada, where she would have her next two bouts: On 9 June 2000, she was stopped by Doris Hackl in the fourth round of a bout between undefeated fighters that was held in Halifax, and, on 23 September she suffered her second knockout loss in a row, defeated by Lisa Brown in two rounds at the Ontario location of Rama.

After losing to Brown, she returned home, where she defeated Joenette Toby on 6 August 2001, also by a four-round decision. On 26 December of that year, she registered her first knockout win, defeating Adriana Francis in the first round.

Alfred then left boxing for a year and a half. When she returned, she flew to Barbados, where she scored her second first-round knockout in a row, beating Vicki Boodram. Back home, a rematch with George awaited. The two fighters were now experienced and well known, and the rematch was eagerly awaited for by Guyanese boxing fans. On 26 December exactly two years to the date that Alfred scored her first knockout win, she outpointed George for the second time, this time over eight rounds.

Her next fight took Alfred to Europe. In that continent, she boxed Alexandra Mattheus on 28 February 2004. Alfred lost by a four-round decision. The fight was held in Denmark.

Her next fight, against the well known Alicia Ashley, was held in Guyana, on 27 March. Alfred was knocked down in round three, and, although she recuperated and lasted the eight round distance, she lost by an eight-round decision.

Immediately after the fight with Ashley, Alfred was given her first chance at winning a championship. On 22 November, she boxed Boodran in a rematch, for the WIBA Iberian-American Bantamweight title. The fight was held in Trinidad and Tobago. Alfred once again beat Boodram by knockout, this time in the third round.

She went on to defeated Marisol Miranda on points but lost to Danielle Bouchard, by unanimous decision in a fight at Bell Centre, Canada on 16 May 2006.

On 26 September 2009, Alfred took on Corinne De Groot for the Women’s International Boxing Association bantamweight title. The fight took place at the Cliff Anderson Sports Hall and Alfred won by a unanimous decision. She defended her title by a TKO in round four in the rematch held at the Princess Ramada Hotel the following year.

Alfred had her last bout on 6 November 2010 defeating Olga Lula over six rounds. In 2012, Alfred was scheduled to fight Mexico’s Zulina Muñoz for the WBA super flyweight title but the fight was cancelled when Alfred tested positive as pregnant. Alfred subsequently retired.

Honors 
A former Sportswoman-of-the-Year (2010), she was the recipient of a house lot in 2011 by then president Bharrat Jagdeo and was the WBC Women’s Inspirational Boxer of the Year in 2011. The Guyana Boxing Board of Control named Alfred Fighter-of-the-Year in 2011.

Personal life 
Alfred was born in Albouystown, Guyana. Growing up she attended St. Stephen’s Primary and later St. Joseph’s High School and although she did not participate in boxing, growing up, she did take part in athletics and karate. Alfred's father, Cecil Alfred, represented Guyana at the 1976 Central and American Caribbean boxing championships held in Jamaica.

Professional boxing record

See also
 List of female boxers

References

External links
 Shondell Alfred at Awakening Fighters
 

1981 births
Living people
Guyanese women boxers
Bantamweight boxers